Nadezhda Petrovna Chernyshova (born 21 March 1951; Russian: Надежда Петровна Чернышёва) is a former coxswain who competed for the Soviet Union in the 1976 Summer Olympics.

In 1976 at the Olympics in Montreal she was the coxswain of the Soviet boat which won the silver medal in the quadruple sculls event.

References

External links
 

1951 births
Soviet female rowers
Coxswains (rowing)
Olympic rowers of the Soviet Union
Rowers at the 1976 Summer Olympics
Olympic silver medalists for the Soviet Union
Olympic medalists in rowing
Medalists at the 1976 Summer Olympics
World Rowing Championships medalists for the Soviet Union
Living people